Varegah may refer to:
 Varegah, Ilam
 Varegah, Kermanshah
 Varegah-e Olya, Kermanshah Province
 Varegah-e Sofla, Kermanshah Province